Malcolm MacRae (17 October 1907 – 26 September 1947) was an Australian rules footballer who played with Essendon and Fitzroy in the Victorian Football League (VFL).

Notes

External links 
		

1907 births
1947 deaths
Australian rules footballers from Melbourne
Essendon Football Club players
Fitzroy Football Club players
People from Ascot Vale, Victoria